"Bust Down" is a song by American rapper Trippie Redd and is the third single and intro track from his second commercial mixtape A Love Letter to You 2. It was released on September 15, 2017. The song was produced by Goose the Guru.

Credits and personnel
 Trippie Redd – vocals, songwriting
 Goose the Guru – production, songwriting
 Igor Mamet – mastering, mixing, recording

Sequel
On November 22, 2019, Trippie released Bust Down Deux on his A Love Letter to You 4 mixtape.

Certifications

References

2017 songs
Trippie Redd songs
Songs written by Trippie Redd